Marie-Louise Victorine Bessarabo (pen names, Héra Mirtel, Juliette de Boulogne, Juliette de Lotus; 24 October 1868 - 21 March 1931) was a French writer, woman of letters, militant feminist, salonnier, lecturer, and ardent suffragist. She was also a spiritist and a believer in the Black Mass, a stock exchange gambler, a plotter for the restoration of the royalist regime in France, as well as an advisor of other women in matrimony and affairs of the heart. Mirtel was famous for the murder of her second husband, Georges Bessarabo, whose body was sent in a "bloody trunk" "from Paris to Nancy, by rail. Brilliantly defended by Vincent de Moro-Giafferi, she was sentenced to twenty years' imprisonment. She was suspected of having murdered her first husband as well.

Early years
Marie-Louise Victorine Grouès was born in Lyon on 24 October 1868. She was the aunt of Abbé Pierre.

Career
Known by her pen name, Héra Mirtel, she wrote novels, poems, plays, and many articles, including columns for Le Sillon de Bordeaux, magazine exclusively written by women; Le Soleil, daily; La Renaissance Contemporaine, literary review; and Le Divan. She was the founder of the newspaper L'Entente, and secretary general of the editorial staff of La Renaissance contemporain. In addition, Mirtel worked in advertising, and lectured at Université Populaire de Montmartre. Mirtel advocated a matriarchal feminism inspired by the theses of Johann Jakob Bachofen.

In 1897, in Saltillo, Mexico, she married Pierre Paul Antoine Jacques, a trader of the Ubaye valley. After becoming financially enriched in Mexico, she became a widow in March 1914, with two daughters, Paule (1898) and Louise (1900). In 1915, in Mexico, she married Ishmael Jacob Providence Weissmann, a commissioner born in Romania, who called himself Georges Bessarabo.

Mirtel murdered Bessarabo in Square La Bruyère, Paris, on 31 July 1920. On 4 August 1920 his corpse, shot dead by a revolver, was discovered at the bottom of a trunk in the Nancy rail station, having been sent by train from the Gare de l'Est. On 21 June 1922 Mirtel, defended by Vincent de Moro-Giafferi, was sentenced to twenty years of forced labor. During the investigation, suspicions weighed on the death of his first husband, who feared that his wife would poison him, and who committed suicide with a revolver in March 1914. But the investigation confirmed the suicide. His daughter, Paule, present at the scene of the crime and judged for complicity, was acquitted. Many dailies followed the trial, rich in theatrics: Le Petit Parisien (17 issues), Le Temps (12 January 1922), Le Matin (22 June 1922), Le Figaro (29 April 1921), Le petit journal illustré (18 June 1922), L'Ouest-Éclair  (June 9, 1922) and Le Gaulois (29 April 1921). Arthur Bernède recounted the lawsuit in the Bessarabo case (Tallandier, 1931).

In 1929, after recognizing that Paule had lied, there was a request for the revision of the trial. Mirtel, incarcerated in Rennes and on the verge of obtaining a conditional release, died on 21 March 1931. She was buried with her first husband, in Saint-Paul-sur-Ubaye, in the Alpes de Haute-Provence.

The Gruesome Case of Mme. Bessarabo

In The Police Journal (1920), L. Czapski provided a narrative of the case:—

Selected works

 Loupita : mœurs mexicaines (E. Sansot, 1907)
 Fleurs d'ombre, suivies de : Fleurs d'aube, Fleurs de lumière. (Paris, E. Sansot, 1910)
 Renée Vivien (1910)
 Leur proie : histoire contemporaine dédiée à toutes celles qui furent leur proie (1912)
 Alphonse de Lamartine et la poésie contemporaine (1913)
 Une doctoresse aux Alpes
 Complaintes de guerre (1916) 
 De la Patrie à la matrie,ou du bagne à l'Éden (1920)

References

Attribution

Bibliography
 

1868 births
1931 deaths
Writers from Lyon
19th-century French women writers
20th-century French women writers
French novelists
French female murderers
French people convicted of murder
People convicted of murder by France
French poets
French columnists
French dramatists and playwrights
French feminists
Radical feminists
French suffragists
French women columnists
Mariticides
French salon-holders